The Ho Chi Minh City ITC Inferno, one of the deadliest peacetime disasters in Vietnam, was a fire that occurred on 29 October 2002, at the International Trade Centre in Ho Chi Minh City, the commercial center of the country.  The building was a six-story business building that housed a luxurious department store, a disco and offices of several foreign companies. The fire killed 60 and injured 90.

The building
The building was insured since 1997, Reuters news service reported, with the total value of the contract at 12.3 billion Vietnamese đồng (800,000 USD).

Inferno
There are reports that there were about 1500 people shopping in the building when the fire started.

State media said 120 people were injured in the fire which began at 1:15 p.m. local time (0615 GMT) on Tuesday. Initial reports indicated it may have been sparked by a short-circuit in the Blue Disco, one of the city's most popular dance spots, on the building's second floor.

Intense heat and lingering flames prevented firefighters from entering the building for about four hours with firefighters taking more than five hours to extinguish the inferno. Bodies were still being recovered from the site late Tuesday though it is unclear whether any foreigners were among the dead or injured.

It was reported that U.S. insurer American International Assurance was holding a training course for more than 100 staff at the time of the fire. There were also reports there was a wedding party in the building. On Wednesday, the building—which contains several floors of shops, around 50 offices and the disco and has a usual occupancy of about 1500 people—was barricaded with police keeping onlookers at bay.

At least five fire fighting vehicles were at the site on Wednesday though none were in use, a far cry from the scene on Tuesday when 30 fire engines and 40 ambulances surrounded the building. The Vietnam People's Army reported that firefighters were not fully equipped to fight the fire and lacked water to put out the flames. Power in the area was cut off and streets cordoned off. Flames raged at other windows sending dense black smoke into the sky as workers fled for their lives, many down steel ladders reaching up from fire trucks below. Others jumped out of the windows.

Aftermath

Two welders were later arrested. They had been working at the disco on the second floor, and it was suspected that sparks from their equipment may have started the blaze. Along with their supervisor and their employer, they were charged with "violating regulations of fire prevention and combating", and received sentences of 2 to 7 years in prison.

International reaction

Chinese Premier Zhu Rongji: "I am shocked to learn of the big fire that occurred in Ho Chi Minh City in Vietnam ... On behalf of the Chinese government and people, and in my own name, I extend my deepest sympathy and sincere condolences to you, and through you, to the bereft families."

European Union foreign policy chief Javier Solana: "Europe is shocked to hear about the inferno and whole Europe extends its deepest sympathies to the families of those, who lost their lives."

Pope John Paul II sent a message expressing condolences to the families of victims of the fire in Ho Chi Minh City.

U.S. President George W. Bush: "I am shocked to learn of the big fire that took the lives of so many innocent people in Ho Chi Minh City. Let us express our sympathy to the families of the victims."

Pakistan Information Minister Sheikh Rashid: "We offer our heartfelt sympathies to those who suffered due to the inferno."

See also
 Gangi department store collapse
 Sampoong Department Store collapse
 2005 Phú Lộc derailment

References

External links
 Culprits of ITC inferno receive 2 to 7-year prison sentences vietnamnews.vnanet.vn
 High hopes for ITC site. (News).(Ho Chi Minh City''s ill-fated International Trade Centre, ravaged by an inferno last October) goliath.ecnext.com
 In pictures: Ho Chi Minh's inferno news.bbc.co.uk
 Chinese Leader Expresses Sympathy over Ho Chi Minh City Fire english.peopledaily.com.cn
 Fire in Ho Chi Minh City Put Out english.people.com.cn
 Dozens feared dead in Saigon fire  www.theage.com.au
 Papal condolences to families of Vietnam inferno victims www.cathnews.com
 Dozens killed in Vietnam office inferno archives.cnn.com
 Memorial for Vietnam fire victim news.bbc.co.uk

2002 disasters in Vietnam
Man-made disasters in Vietnam
2002 fires in Asia
2002 in Vietnam
Fires in Vietnam
October 2002 events in Asia
21st century in Ho Chi Minh City
Commercial building fires